Senecio cerberoanus is a species of the genus Senecio, family Asteraceae and one of the many species of Senecio native to Chile.

References

External links

coquimbensis
Flora of Chile